Freak Puke is the eighteenth album by the Melvins, under the name Melvins Lite, released on June 5, 2012 through Ipecac Recordings. It is the first to feature one of the Melvins' alternate lineups with Trevor Dunn on standup bass.

Track listing

Vinyl version
Freak Puke was released on vinyl through Amphetamine Reptile Records in a box featuring the album cover. Inside would be a picture disc depicting the album cover on one side and one of five different artists on the other. The five artists chosen to provide the artwork were Skinner, Dave Cooper, Tara McPherson, Gary Taxali and Mackie Osborne.

Personnel
King Buzzo – guitar, vocals
Dale Crover – drums, vocals
Trevor Dunn – standup bass, vocals
with
James McAleer – backing vocals (track 9)
Dan Raymond – backing vocals & additional guitar (track 9)

Additional personnel
Toshi Kasai – engineer
John Golden – mastering
Mackie Osborne – artwork

References

2012 albums
Melvins albums
Ipecac Recordings albums